Pedro Henrique Pereira da Silva (born 18 December 1992), simply known as Pedro Henrique or Pedrão, is a Brazilian professional footballer who plays as a centre-back for Singapore Premier League club Lion City Sailors.

Club career
Pedrão began his career in 2010 with Goiás. He was loaned to Trindade and twice to Aparecidense in the following years. With the departure of regulars from the squad, Pedrão was made a regular.

He was part of a Goiás defence which conceded just 40 goals in the 2014 Campeonato Brasileiro Série A season, less than numerous teams above them, including third-placed Internacional. He scored one goal in the season. He signed for Portuguese team Vitória de Guimarães in 2015 and has become a leader at the back, making over 100 appearances for the club.

In 2022, he came to Singapore to join the Lion City Sailors.

Career statistics

Club

References

External links
 Futebol de Goyaz profile 
 

1992 births
Living people
Association football defenders
Brazilian footballers
Brazilian expatriate footballers
Goiás Esporte Clube players
Vitória S.C. players
Al-Wehda Club (Mecca) players
Atlético Clube Goianiense players
Lion City Sailors FC players
Campeonato Brasileiro Série A players
Primeira Liga players
Saudi Professional League players
Expatriate footballers in Portugal
Expatriate footballers in Saudi Arabia
Expatriate footballers in Singapore
Brazilian expatriate sportspeople in Portugal
Brazilian expatriate sportspeople in Saudi Arabia
Brazilian expatriate sportspeople in Singapore
Sportspeople from Goiânia